Palaver, AKA Palaver: A Romance of Northern Nigeria, is a 1926 silent film shot in British Nigeria, recognized as the first Nigerian feature film.

The film was significant for its use of non-professional local Nigerians as actors. While not a box-office success, it was to prove significant in the larger history of Nigerian cinema.

Plot
The film portrays conflicts between a British District Officer and a local tin miner which lead to war.

Criticism
Later commentators have classified Palaver amongst other colonial films which claimed the "beneficent influence of the white man in Africa."Geoffrey Barkas (director, producer and scriptwriter) himself, in interviews about his work, referred to his casting from "cannibal pagan tribes" and spoke of their "blind savagery."

Nigerian Pulse magazine in 2017 described the film as "proudly racist", and noted: "Even though it was produced in Nigeria, Palaver was made for the British audience. There is no error in that the narrative was consistent with the popular idea sold in Europe that the colonial masters were doing Africans a favour by colonizing them."

See also
 Filmmaking in Colonial Nigeria

References

External links
 Palaver: A Romance of Northern Nigeria at the British Film Institute

1926 films
Nigerian drama films
Films directed by Geoffrey Barkas